Regina Coronation Park is a provincial electoral district for the Legislative Assembly of Saskatchewan, Canada. Originally created as "Regina North" for the 20th Saskatchewan general election in 1982, this constituency was called "Regina Albert North" from 1991 to 1995.

This district includes the Regina neighbourhoods of Argyle Park/Englewood, City View, Highland Park, Coronation Park and Churchill Downs.

Members of the Legislative Assembly

Election results

|-

 
|NDP
|Jaime Garcia
|align="right"|2,756
|align="right"|44.04
|align="right"|-11.89

|- bgcolor="white"
!align="left" colspan=3|Total
!align="right"|6,258
!align="right"|100.00
!align="right"|

|-
 
| style="width: 130px" |NDP
|Kim Trew
|align="right"|4,122
|align="right"|55.93
|align="right"|-6.92

|- bgcolor="white"
!align="left" colspan=3|Total
!align="right"|7,370
!align="right"|100.00
!align="right"|

|-
 
| style="width: 130px" |NDP
|Kim Trew
|align="right"|4,439
|align="right"|62.85
|align="right"|+10.66

 
|Prog. Conservative
|Kenneth R. Johnson 
|align="right"|47
|align="right"|0.67
|align="right"|-1.10
|- bgcolor="white"
!align="left" colspan=3|Total
!align="right"|7,063
!align="right"|100.00
!align="right"|

|-
 
| style="width: 130px" |NDP
|Kim Trew
|align="right"|3,297
|align="right"|52.19
|align="right"|-11.33

 
|Prog. Conservative
|Ian Kimball
|align="right"|112
|align="right"|1.77
|align="right"|-5.00
|- bgcolor="white"
!align="left" colspan=3|Total
!align="right"|6,317
!align="right"|100.00
!align="right"|

|-
 
| style="width: 130px" |NDP
|Kim Trew
|align="right"|4,240
|align="right"|63.52
|align="right"|+2.55

 
|Prog. Conservative
|Roy Gaebel
|align="right"|452
|align="right"|6.77
|align="right"|-3.34
|- bgcolor="white"
!align="left" colspan=3|Total
!align="right"|6,675
!align="right"|100.00
!align="right"|

|-
 
| style="width: 130px" |NDP
|Kim Trew
|align="right"|5,313
|align="right"|60.97
|align="right"|+2.25

 
|Prog. Conservative
|Roy Gaebel
|align="right"|881
|align="right"|10.11
|align="right"|-20.27
|- bgcolor="white"
!align="left" colspan=3|Total
!align="right"|8,714
!align="right"|100.00
!align="right"|

Regina North (1982 – 1991)

|-
 
| style="width: 130px" |NDP
|Kim Trew
|align="right"|6,008
|align="right"|58.72
|align="right"|+20.81
 
|Prog. Conservative
|Ken Skilnick
|align="right"|3,109
|align="right"|30.38
|align="right"|-29.27

|- bgcolor="white"
!align="left" colspan=3|Total
!align="right"|10,232
!align="right"|100.00
!align="right"|

|-
 
| style="width: 130px" |Prog. Conservative
|Jack Klein
|align="right"|5,845
|align="right"|59.65
|align="right"|*
 
|NDP
|Stan Oxelgren
|align="right"|3,715
|align="right"|37.91
|align="right"|*

|- bgcolor="white"
!align="left" colspan=3|Total
!align="right"|9,799
!align="right"|100.00
!align="right"|

References

External links 
Website of the Legislative Assembly of Saskatchewan
Saskatchewan Archives Board – Saskatchewan Election Results By Electoral Division
Statistics Canada Information on Regina Coronation Park
Map of Regina Coronation Park riding as of 2016

Saskatchewan provincial electoral districts
Politics of Regina, Saskatchewan